The title of Duke of Olomouc or Prince of Olomouc was held by members of the Bohemian Přemyslid dynasty in the Middle Ages in Moravia. Olomouc was a gord (Slavic fortified settlement) in Moravia.

Bretislav I (r. 1031–?)
Otto (r. 1061–87)
Boleslaus (r.  1087)
Svatopluk (r. 1090–1107)
Otto the Black (r.  1126)
Václav (r. 1126–30)
Otto III (r. 1140–60)
Frederick (r. 1164–72)
Oldřich (r. 1173–77)
Vladimír (r.  1195–96)
Mikulaš (r.  1269)

References

Sources
 

Olomouc
Medieval Czech history
History of Moravia